Rothfuss is a surname. Notable people with the surname include:

 Andrea Rothfuss (born 1989), German para-alpine skier
 Chris Rothfuss (born 1972), American politician
 Jack Rothfuss (1872–1947), American baseball player
 Patrick Rothfuss (born 1973), American fantasy writer and college lecturer